Gordon Goodwin's Big Phat Band, or simply The Big Phat Band, is an 18-piece jazz orchestra that combines the big band swing of the 1930s and 1940s with contemporary music such as funk and jazz fusion. The band is led by Gordon Goodwin, who arranges, composes, plays piano and saxophone. Since its origin, the Big Phat Band has received several Grammy Awards and many Grammy nominations.

Its first album, Swingin' for the Fences, was the first recording released on DVD-Audio and the first DVD-Audio to be nominated for two Grammy Awards.

When he founded the Big Phat Band in 1999, Goodwin was working in Hollywood as a composer for Warner Brothers cartoons. His first attraction to big band music was at the age of 13 when he heard Count Basie.

Band members 

Gordon Goodwin - Leader/Piano/Saxophone

Saxophones/Woodwinds 
 Eric Marienthal – 1st alto saxophone / soprano saxophone / piccolo / flute
 Sal Lozano – 2nd alto saxophone / piccolo / flute / clarinet
 Brian Scanlon – 1st tenor saxophone / clarinet / flute
 Jeff Driskill – 2nd tenor saxophone / clarinet / flute
 Jay Mason – baritone saxophone / bass clarinet / flute

Trumpets 
 Wayne Bergeron – 1st trumpet
 Dan Fornero – 2nd (split lead) trumpet
 Mike Rocha – 3rd trumpet
 Dan Savant – 4th trumpet

Trombones 
 Andy Martin – 1st trombone
 Charlie Morillas – 2nd trombone
 Francisco Torres – 3rd trombone
 Craig Gosnell – bass trombone

Rhythm section 
 Gordon Goodwin – piano
 Will Brahm – guitar
 Kevin Axt – bass
 Ray Brinker – drums
 Joey DeLeon – percussion

Temporary players 
 Dan Higgins – 1st alto saxophone (Swingin' for the Fences)
 Ray Brinker – drums
 Grant Geissman – guitar (Swingin' for the Fences, XXL, The Phat Pack, Act Your Age)
 Carl Verheyen – guitar
 Luis Conte – percussion
 Dennis Farias- 1st trumpet (Sing Sang Sung)

Previous Players 

 Bernie Dresel - Drums
 Bob Summers - Trumpet
 Craig Ware - Bass Trombone
 Colin Meyer - Trombone
 Alex Iles - Trombone
 Willie Murillo - Trumpet
 Andrew Synowick - Guitar

Featured soloists
 Arturo Sandoval, Brian McKnight, Chick Corea, Dave Grusin, Dave Siebels, David Sanborn, Dianne Reeves, Eddie Daniels, James Morrison, Johnny Mathis, Judith Hill, Lee Ritenour, Marcus Miller, Michael Brecker, Nathan East, Nikko Paolo Silangcruz, Patti Austin, Romain Guyot, Take 6

Discography 
 Swingin' for the Fences (Silverline, 2000)
 XXL (Silverline, 2003)
 The Phat Pack (Immergent, 2006)
 Bah, Humduck! A Looney Tunes Christmas (Immergent, 2006)
 Act Your Age (Immergent, 2008)
 Dave Siebels With: Gordon Goodwin's Big Phat Band (PBGL, 2009)
 That's How We Roll (Telarc, 2011)
 Life in the Bubble (Telarc, 2014)
 Wrap This! (Music of Content, 2015)
 The Gordian Knot (Music of Content, 2019)
 The Reset (Music of Content, 2021)

Awards and honors

Grammy Awards
 Best Instrumental Arrangement – "On Green Dolphin Street" (2014)
 Best Large Jazz Ensemble Album, Life in the Bubble (2016)

Grammy Award nominations
 Best Large Jazz Ensemble Album – XXL (2003), Act Your Age (2008)
 Best Instrumental Composition – "Hunting Wabbits", (2003), "Hit the Ground Running" (2008), "Hunting Wabbits 3 (Get off my Lawn)" (2012)
 Best Instrumental Arrangement – "Attack of the Killer Tomatoes" (2006), "Yo Tannenbaum" (2007), "Yesterdays" (2008), "Rhapsody in Blue" (2012), "Party Rockers" (2015)
 Best Instrumental Arrangement with Vocals – "Comes Love" with Brian McKnight and Take 6 (2003)

Other awards
 Surround Sound Award, "Best Made for Surround Sound Title", XXL (2003)

References

External links 
 Official site
 Los Angeles Times Grammy award nominations database

American jazz ensembles from California
Musical groups from Los Angeles
Grammy Award winners
Big bands
Jazz musicians from California